Karidja Touré (born 14 February 1994) is a French actress best known for starring in the film Girlhood.

Life and career
Karidja Touré was born in the Paris Suburb of Bondy, France, the daughter of an estate agent and a childcare worker. Both of Touré's parents are from the Ivory Coast. She grew up in the 15th arrondissement of Paris and is a practising Muslim.

Touré was in her first year of an assistant management programme when she was scouted by a casting director while at an amusement park for Céline Sciamma's film Girlhood. For her work in the film she was nominated for a César Award for Most Promising Actress.

She auditioned for the role of Storm in X-Men: Apocalypse, but the part eventually went to American actress Alexandra Shipp. In June 2015, she appeared in the music video for Louane Emera's single "Jeune (j'ai envie)".

Filmography

References

External links

21st-century French actresses
People from Bondy
French people of Ivorian descent
French film actresses
Living people
1994 births